In algebraic number theory Eisenstein's reciprocity law is a reciprocity law that extends the law of quadratic reciprocity and the cubic reciprocity law to residues of higher powers. It is one of the earliest and simplest of the higher reciprocity laws, and is a consequence of several later and stronger reciprocity laws such as the Artin reciprocity law.

Background and notation

Let   be an integer, and let     be the ring of integers of the m-th cyclotomic field     where    is a   
primitive m-th root of unity.

Primary numbers

There is an integer   making   primary. This integer is unique  
  is primary.

The significance of  

 which appears in the definition is most easily seen when  

  is a prime.  In that case  

   Furthermore, the prime ideal  

  of  

  is totally ramified in 

  and the ideal  

  is prime of degree 1.Lemmermeyer, prop. 3.1

m-th power residue symbol

 If  and  then 
 If  then  is not an m-th power 
 If  then  may or may not be an m-th power

Statement of the theorem

Let      be an odd prime and      an integer relatively prime to      Then

First supplement

Second supplement

Eisenstein reciprocity

Let   be primary (and therefore relatively prime to   ), and assume that    is also relatively prime to  . Then

Proof

The theorem is a consequence of the Stickelberger relation.

 gives a historical discussion of some early reciprocity laws, including a proof of Eisenstein's law using Gauss and Jacobi sums that is based on Eisenstein's original proof.

Generalization

In 1922 Takagi proved that if   is an arbitrary algebraic number field containing the -th roots of unity for a prime , then Eisenstein's law for -th powers holds in

Applications

First case of Fermat's Last Theorem

Assume that 
 
is an odd prime, that 
  
for pairwise relatively prime integers 
(i.e. in
 
)  

and that 

This is the first case of Fermat's Last Theorem. (The second case is when )   Eisenstein reciprocity can be used to prove the following theorems

(Wieferich 1909)  Under the above assumptions,  

The only primes below 6.7×1015 that satisfy this are 1093 and 3511. See Wieferich primes for details and current records.

(Mirimanoff 1911) Under the above assumptions  

Analogous results are true for all primes ≤ 113, but the proof does not use Eisenstein's law. See Wieferich prime#Connection with Fermat's Last Theorem.

(Furtwängler 1912)   Under the above assumptions, for every prime   

(Furtwängler 1912) Under the above assumptions, for every prime   

(Vandiver) Under the above assumptions, if in addition  

  then  

  and

Powers mod most primes

Eisenstein's law can be used to prove the following theorem (Trost, Ankeny, Rogers).   Suppose   

  and that   

  where   

  is an odd prime. If   

  is solvable for all but finitely many primes   

  then

See also

Quartic reciprocity
Octic reciprocity
Wieferich's criterion
Mirimanoff's congruence

Notes

References

Algebraic number theory